Onyx Boox (stylized as BOOX) is a brand of e-book reader produced by Onyx International Inc, based in China. Like most e-book readers, the Boox uses electronic paper technology.

Devices

i63ML Newton
The Onyx Boox i63ML Newton (I63MLP_HD) device is the first eReader with access to Google Play. It has a 1 GHz processor, 512Mb DDR and 8 Gb internal storage memory. Build on SoC Rockchip RK2906 and Android Gingerbread 2.3.1 (API level 9, NDK 5) Linux kernel 2.6.32.27. It has 6" E-Ink Carta display 1024x758 px (14:1 contrast) with Moonight backlight.

i62ML
Onyx Boox i62ML (Moon Light) (also called "Firefly", "Angel Glow" or "Aurora" depending on the country it is sold in) is a device with 800 MHz Cortex A8 CPU, 128Mb DDR, 4Gb internal memory, a 6-inch E Ink Pearl HD infrared touch screen, with 1024×758 resolution, 16 level grey scale and built in front-light technology called Moon Light.

M92
Onyx Boox M92 is a device with a 9.7 inch E Ink Pearl screen with electromagnetic touch, 1200×825 resolution and 16 level grey scale. It supports the Hanvon stylus for touchscreen navigation and note taking. It was released in November 2011.

E43
An Android-based (2.3) smart phone and e-reader, the primary screen of which will be a 4.3 inch e-Ink display.  The specs indicate it will be a tri-band device and will lack the 850 MHz band that is needed in the USA.

C65HD/C65ML
The Onyx BOOX C65 is an Android-based (2.3) device with a 6-inch E Ink HD EPD multi-touch capacitive touch screen with 1024x758 pixel resolution at 212 ppi and 16 grey levels. It comes in two versions, the C65HD "Storia" (burgundy) and the C65ML "AfterGlow" (graphite), the latter with a Modern Front-Light system. Specifications for the device include a 1 GHz Cortex A8 CPU, 512 MB RAM, 4 GB flash memory, 802.11 b/g/n WiFi, and a MicroSD card slot. Weight: 186 g (6.6 oz), Size: 170x117x8.7 mm (6.7x4.6x0.3 in).

C67ML
The Onyx BOOX C67 is an Android-based (4.2) device with a 6-inch E Ink HD EPD multi-touch capacitive touch screen with 1024x758 pixel resolution at 212 ppi and 16 grey levels. It comes in two versions, the C67ML (no Google Play store support) and the C67ML "Afterglow 2". Specifications for the device include a 1 GHz Cortex-A9 dual core cpu, 512 MB RAM, 4 GB flash memory, 802.11 b/g/n WiFi, and a MicroSD card slot. Weight: 186 g (6.6 oz), Size: 171x117x9 mm (6.7x4.6x0.3 in).

T68
The Onyx BOOX T68 is an Android 4.0 based e-reader/tablet with 6.8 inch E Ink Pearl HD (1440 x 1080) screen. It runs on a 1 GHz Freescale i.MX6 ARM Cortex A9 processor. It comes with 512MB RAM, 4GB of storage, a microSD card slot, audio jack,  wifi, bluetooth, can use Google Play Books and the Amazon Kindle Store and has a text-to-speech capability when a bluetooth speaker is used.

i86
The Onyx BOOX i86 is an Android 4.0 based e-reader with 8 inch E Ink Pearl 1600x1200, infrared touchscreen and runs on a 1 GHz Cortex A9 processor. It comes with 512MB RAM, 4GB of storage, a microSD card slot, audio jack,  wifi, bluetooth.

Onyx Boox Max 
The Onyx Boox Max is an Android 4.0 based e-reader/tablet with a 13.3 inch E Mobius 1200x1600 screen.

The Onyx Boox Max Carta is an Android 4.0 based e-reader/tablet with 13.3 inch E Carta flexible display 1650×2200 screen.

The Onyx Boox Max 2 is an Android 6 based e-reader/tablet with a 13.3 inch E Mobius 1650×2200 screen with 2GB RAM, 32GB Internal memory, stereo output, microphone, HDMI and USB 2 specifications

The Onyx Boox Max 2 Pro is an Android 6 based e-reader/tablet with a 13.3 inch E Mobius 1650×2200 screen with 4GB RAM, 64GB Internal memory, stereo output, microphone, micro HDMI and micro USB specifications

The Onyx Boox Max 3 is an Android 9 based e-reader/tablet with a 13.3 inch E Mobius 1650×2200 screen with 4GB RAM, 64GB Internal memory, stereo output, microphone, micro HDMI and USB C specifications

Onyx Boox Nova 
Onyx Boox Nova is a 7.8inch ereader with edge-to-edge glass and a brand new design. Onyx plans to make 2 different versions, a waterproof one with microUSB port, and standard one with USB-C. It will hit the market on 2018.

Onyx Boox Note Pro and Nova Pro 
After collecting many customers' feedbacks, Onyx decided to introduce Onyx Boox Note Pro and Boox Nova Pro at CES 2019. The two new models are equipped with pen input via Wacom digitizer and a CTM (warm and cold) frontlight. Onyx Boox Nova Pro and Onyx Boox Note Pro were released later in 2019.

Onyx Boox Max Lumi 
Onyx Boox Max Lumi is the long-awaited 13" ebook reader with integrated frontlight. It's an evolution of the previous Onyx Boox Max 3 with a faster hardware platform and of course the new glowing E-Ink panel. Onyx Boox Max Lumi is available since the end of September 2020.

Onyx Boox Poke 
The Onyx Boox Poke is a Kindle Paperwhite sized (6 inches) ereader. The Onyx Boox Poke 2 Color is the first color ereader Onyx Boox ever made. The Poke series does not have any pens to take notes with. The earlier version has a sunken screen, but the current (monochrome) Poke 3 has a flush screen.

Onyx Boox Tab Ultra and Tab X 
The Onyx Boox Tab Ultra is a 10.3" note taking device, with an optional keyboard cover. It contains a custom GPU to improve the refresh performance of the e-ink display. The Onyx Boox Tab X is a 13.3" note taking device, which supports a separate Bluetooth keyboard and also uses a custom GPU.

Release dates

GPL Compliance
As of 2022, Onyx International Inc. has declined to release the source code with Linux kernel modifications licensed under the GNU General Public License version 2 in response to a written request by a user. The GPLv2 license states that if a modified version of a covered work (such as the Linux kernel) is released, the corresponding source code must also be released under GPLv2.

See also
 Comparison of e-book readers
 Comparison of tablet computers
E-Ink
E-Paper

References

External links
  (manufacturer)

Chinese brands
Dedicated ebook devices
Electronic paper technology